Arazi Masnali is a village in the Islamabad Capital Territory of Pakistan. It is located at 33° 22' 10N 73° 17' 50E with an altitude of 497 metres (1633 feet).

References 

Union councils of Islamabad Capital Territory
Villages in Islamabad Capital Territory